Arens Mateli (born 10 July 2000) is an Albanian footballer who plays as a attacking midfielder for Kosovan club Ballkani.

Club career

Kukësi
In October 2019, Mateli made his competitive debut for the club, starting in a 6-0 Cup victory over Shkumbini. He made his first appearance in the Kategoria Superiore later that season, coming on as a 70th-minute substitute for Besar Musolli in a 3–0 victory over Teuta Durrës on July 11.

Akhisarspor

In January 2021, Mateli joined Akhisarspor (Akhisar Belediyespor). Mateli have signed 5 Year Deal with Relegated Promotion Clause. Akhisar is part of TFF First League.

Career statistics

Club

References

External links
Arens Mateli at FK Kukësi Official Website

2000 births
Living people
FK Kukësi players
Kategoria Superiore players
Albanian footballers
Association football forwards